Marlow Heights is an unincorporated area and census-designated place (CDP) in Prince George's County, Maryland, United States. The population was 6,169 at the 2020 census. The Marlow Heights Shopping Center first opened in 1957 (but extended in 1960 with Hecht's), adjacent to the large community of Hillcrest Heights. It was joined ten years later, in 1967, by the two-level Iverson Mall, the Washington metropolitan area's first enclosed mall.

For mailing address purposes, the area is part of Temple Hills or Suitland. Marlow Heights is located near the U.S. Census Bureau, Andrews Air Force Base, the Metrorail Green Line and Capitol Hill.

Geography
Marlow Heights is located at  (38.825263, −76.947864).

Demographics

2020 census

Note: the US Census treats Hispanic/Latino as an ethnic category. This table excludes Latinos from the racial categories and assigns them to a separate category. Hispanics/Latinos can be of any race.

2000 Census
As of the census of 2000, there were 6,059 people, 2,316 households, and 1,588 families residing in the CDP. The racial makeup of the CDP was 8.12% White, 88.53% African American, 0.23% Native American, 1.02% Asian, 0.36% from other races, and 1.73% from two or more races. Hispanic or Latino of any race were 1.52% of the population.

There were 2,316 households, out of which 35.1% had children under the age of 18 living with them, 35.9% were married couples living together, 26.2% had a female householder with no husband present, and 31.4% were non-families. 24.4% of all households were made up of individuals, and 3.9% had someone living alone who was 65 years of age or older. The average household size was 2.61 and the average family size was 3.09.

In the CDP, the population was spread out, with 27.7% under the age of 18, 9.6% from 18 to 24, 31.9% from 25 to 44, 22.8% from 45 to 64, and 8.0% who were 65 years of age or older. The median age was 34 years. For every 100 females, there were 84.8 males. For every 100 females age 18 and over, there were 77.3 males.

The median income for a household in the CDP was $46,995, and the median income for a family was $52,875. Males had a median income of $33,935 versus $32,500 for females. The per capita income for the CDP was $21,629. About 4.6% of families and 7.8% of the population were below the poverty line, including 8.4% of those under age 18 and 4.5% of those age 65 or over.

Government
Prince George's County Police Department District 4 Station in Glassmanor CDP, with an Oxon Hill postal address, serves the community.

The United States Postal Service operates the Temple Hills Post Office in the Marlow Heights CDP, with a Temple Hills postal address.

Education
The CDP is served by the Prince George's County Public Schools district.

Sections are served by Barnaby Manor and Hillcrest Heights elementary schools. Sections are served by Benjamin Stoddert and Thurgood Marshall middle schools. Sections are served by Crossland High School and Potomac High School.

Imagine Schools operates Imagine Lincoln Public Charter School in Marlow Heights; it has a Temple Hills postal address.

References

External links

 Marlow Heights 60s and 70s

Census-designated places in Prince George's County, Maryland
Census-designated places in Maryland
Washington metropolitan area